This is a list of kings regnant and queens regnant of the Kingdom and Crown of Castile. For their predecessors, see List of Castilian counts.

Kings and Queens of Castile

Jiménez dynasty

House of Ivrea

The following dynasts are descendants, in the male line, of Urraca's first husband, Raymond of Burgundy.

Succession crisis

Following the death of Peter, a succession crisis arose between Peter's illegitimate half-brother Henry of Trastámara and the Englishman John of Gaunt, a great great grandson of Ferdinand III of Castile, who claimed the title of King of Castile and Léon by virtue of his marriage to Constance, daughter of Peter.  Henry took the throne by force, and faced several military actions by John of Gaunt, who had forged an alliance with John I of Portugal in an attempt to enforce his claim, however John of Gaunt was unsuccessful in his campaigns, and Henry established the House of Trastámara as the new ruling dynasty of Castile.

House of Trastámara

Henry II was the illegitimate son of Alfonso XI.  He was made count of Trastámara.

House of Habsburg

House of Bourbon

The Crown of Castile existed in its own right within the Spanish crown and with its own law until the arrival of the Bourbon dynasty after the War of Spanish Succession.

See also

List of Castilian consorts

List of Aragonese monarchs
List of Leonese monarchs
List of Navarrese monarchs
List of Spanish monarchs

Further reading
Barton, Simon. The Aristocracy in Twelfth-Century León and Castile. Cambridge University Press, 1997. Appendix I: "The Counts of Twelfth Century León and Castile and Aragon, pp. 235–302.

 01
Lists of Spanish monarchs
.